Barbora Mišendová (born 12 February 1998) is a Slovak swimmer. She competed in the women's 100 metre butterfly event at the 2017 World Aquatics Championships.

References

1998 births
Living people
Slovak female swimmers
Place of birth missing (living people)
Swimmers at the 2014 Summer Youth Olympics
Female butterfly swimmers
20th-century Slovak women
21st-century Slovak women